Crooked Creek is a stream in the U.S. state of Missouri. It is a tributary of the North Fork Salt River.

Crooked Creek was so named on account of its many meanders.

See also
List of rivers of Missouri

References

Rivers of Monroe County, Missouri
Rivers of Shelby County, Missouri
Rivers of Missouri